Viva Communications Inc., formerly known as Viva Entertainment Inc. and simply Viva, is a Philippine media and entertainment company headquartered in Pasig City. It was founded on November 11, 1981, by Vic del Rosario and his sister Tess Cruz.

Divisions

Viva Communications Inc. (VCI)
Viva Films
Neo Films (1995–2003, liquidated)
Falcon Films
Viva Television
Vintage Television
Mega Productions (co-owned by Sharon Cuneta and Vic del Rosarios)
Viva International Pictures (VIP)
Viva Artists Agency (VAA)
Viva Live (formerly Viva Concerts & Events)
Halo Halo Radio (Ultimate Entertainment)
Halo Halo Radio 105.1 Cebu
Halo Halo Radio 97.1 Davao
Halo Halo Radio 103.5 Zamboanga
Viva Interactive
Viva Networks
PBO: Pinoy Box Office
Viva Cinema (formerly Viva TV, from STAR TV package)
TMC: Tagalized Movie Channel (co-owned with MVP Entertainment)
Sari-Sari Channel (joint venture with Cignal TV/TV5 Network Inc.)
K Movies Pinoy (defunct)
Viva TV Plus (formerly Viva TV)
Filipino TV (defunct)
Joint venture with A+E Networks
History
H2 (defunct)
Fyi (defunct)
Crime & Investigation Network
Lifetime
Joint venture with Celestial Tiger Entertainment
Celestial Movies Pinoy
Joint venture with WakuWaku Japan Corporation
WakuWaku Japan (defunct)
Globalgate Entertainment
Digital Network
Oomph TV (multichannel network, social media agency)
Vivamax (over-the-top streaming service)
Viva Video, Inc. (Viva Communications' home video subsidiary)
Video City (liquidated)
Viva Sports

Viva Music Group (VMG)
Viva Records
Vicor Music
Verje Music Publishing (VMP)
Harmony Music Publishing
Amerasian Recording Studios
O/C Records (affiliate; label owned by Kean Cipriano)

Viva Publishing Group
Viva PSICOM Publishing Corporation (formerly PSICOM Publishing Inc., 50%) - joint venture with the Gabriel family
Viva Starmometer Publishing Corporation (formerly Starmometer Publishing Company, 50%) - joint venture with Edsel Roy
VRJ Books Publishing

Viva International Food & Restaurants
Botejyu
Paper Moon Cake Boutique
Pepi Cubano 
Yogorino
Wing Zone

Notable brands and subsidiaries

Viva Cable TV

Pinoy Box Office

Viva Cinema

Viva TV

Halo Halo Radio
Halo Halo Radio is a brand name for Viva's radio stations. It was launched as Oomph! Radio before the end of 2014 following the acquisition of Ultimate Entertainment and its FM stations (but spun-off its concert/theatrical production arm and became Ultimate Shows, which remained owned by the Manalang family), thus it is Viva's new venture into radio broadcasting. Its format playlist consisted of local and international songs.

In May 2016, Viva Live briefly dropped the Oomph! Radio brand and went to an independent branding among stations by adding 70s, 80s and 90s music to its playlist, despite retaining its format and the Ultimate Radio name. In July 2016, however, Viva Live brought back the Oomph! Radio brand and its Top 40/OPM format. In February 2017, the Oomph! Radio brand was dropped permanently due to management decision.

In May 2017, Oomph! Radio was relaunched as Halo Halo Radio, an all-OPM station. With this launch, Halo Halo Radio became the de facto provincial counterpart of Manila-based Pinas FM 95.5 (a radio station of Iglesia ni Cristo's for-profit broadcast arm Eagle Broadcasting Corporation), the country's first all OPM radio station.

Halo Halo Radio stations

Viva Video Inc.
Viva Video Inc. (formerly Viva Home Entertainment, doing business as Viva Video) is the exclusive distributor of video products for local and international studios in the Philippines. Viva Video, Inc. is the home video affiliate of Viva Communications, Inc.

Viva Video, Inc. is the home video and DVD distribution arm of Viva Communications with the exclusive distributor of video products including films and television series.

The company releases titles from the film and television library of Viva Films, as well as programs from other Viva Entertainment companies. Currently, they also serve as the distributor for television and/or movie product licensed by Nickeloedeon, Universal Studios Home Entertainment, 20th Century Studios Home Entertainment, Cartoon Network, Big Idea Productions (makers of VeggieTales DVDs), Turner Entertainment Co., Cookie Jar Entertainment (partnership with DIC Entertainment until 2008), Walt Disney Studios Home Entertainment (since 2014, distribution of Disney material had shifted to Magnavision Home Video), Skyfilms, Nine Network (makers of Hi-5 DVDs), Summit Entertainment, Lionsgate Home Entertainment, Sesame Workshop (makers of Sesame Street), HIT Entertainment, and MGA Entertainment internationally for the Philippine market, and local products from Viva Films, APT Entertainment, OctoArts Films, Regal Entertainment, Solar Entertainment, Studio5, FPJ Productions and Pioneer Films.

Viva Video holds licenses for:

Local
Viva Films
APT Entertainment
OctoArts Films
Regal Entertainment
Solar Entertainment
Studio5
FPJ Productions
Pioneer Films
KP Entertainment Philippines
International
Cookie Jar Entertainment (formerly Cinar, Filmfair and DIC Entertainment)
20th Century Fox Home Entertainment
Walt Disney Studios Home Entertainment (including Touchstone Home Entertainment)
MGM Home Entertainment, phased out in 2005 as MGM Holdings
ABC
MGA Entertainment
Summit Entertainment
Lionsgate Home Entertainment
Syndicate Films
Emperor Motion Pictures
Lakeshore Entertainment
Mandate Pictures
Icon Entertainment
Bauer Martinez
Inferno Distribution
Cineclick Asia
Cinema Service
Miro Vision
Skyfilms (distribution duties are also shared by Star Home Video)
Nick Jr.
Nickelodeon
Nine Network (makers of Hi-5 DVDs for the Philippine market)
HIT Entertainment
Big Idea Productions (makers of ‘’VeggieTales’’ DVDs for the Philippine market)
Sesame Workshop (makers of Sesame Street DVDs for the Philippine market)
Cartoon Network
Turner Entertainment
Universal Studios Home Entertainment
Playboy Home Entertainment

Viva Video City
Viva Video City was the video retail affiliate of Viva Video, the home video unit of Viva Communications, Inc. As of 2015, all of the stores in the country are closed.

Viva Sports
Viva Sports is a sports division of Viva Communications was launched in 1996 showcases the previous boxing fights of Manny Pacquiao as Blow By Blow aired on IBC 13 & Viva Boxing Greats on RPN 9 & also the throwback episodes of a basketball coverage of PBA and a billiards game of Efren Bata Reyes.

Viva-Psicom Publishing

Viva PSICOM Publishing Corporation (Viva PSICOM) is a publishing company jointly owned by Viva Communications and the Gabriel family. It was founded in 1990 by Arnel Jose Gabriel as a small desktop publisher, which later evolved into publishing the first Filipino wholly owned trade newspaper, the now-defunct Philippine IT Update.

The company, then known as PSICOM, rose to fame through the Diary ng Panget tetralogy authored by HaveYouSeenThisGirL.

In August 2013, Viva Communications acquired 50% of the company stocks, and it was later renamed as Viva-Psicom.

Products

Magazines
 OtakuZine
 Otaku Asia
 OtakuZine Anime Recommendation
 FH&S
 The GOLD Magazine
 Bare

Horror
 True Philippine Ghost Stories (Some stories were later adapted as episodes of GMA Network's Wag Kukurap.)
 Haunted Philippines (Some stories were later adapted as episodes of GMA Network's Wag Kukurap.)
 Pinoy Tales of Terror

Books by well-known authors
Ramon Bautista (later moved to ABS-CBN Publishing)
Tado
Papa Dan of Barangay LS 97.1
Papa Dudut of Barangay LS 97.1

Wattpad
HaveYouSeenThisGirL
Diary ng Panget
Voiceless
She Died
That Girl
Aly Almario
My Prince
He's a Kidnapper
The Other Side
Reaching You
Alesana Marie
Talk Back and You're Dead
Marcelo Santos III
Para sa Hopeless Romantic (republished)
Para sa Broken-Hearted
Mahal mo Siya, Mahal Ka Ba?

Japanese manga
Hajime Isayama
Attack on Titan
Mashima Hiro
Fairy Tail

Other genres
Viva PSICOM Dark Series
Kilig Republic
GOLD Manga Series

References

External links
 Official homepage
 Forum Page
 Viva TV on Satellite TV in the United States
 Facebook
 YouTube
 Twitter
 Instagram

 
Television in the Philippines
Entertainment companies of the Philippines
Mass media companies of the Philippines
Mass media in Metro Manila
Television in Metro Manila
Entertainment companies established in 1981
Mass media companies established in 1981
Companies based in Pasig
Philippine companies established in 1981
Privately held companies of the Philippines